This is a list of the stained-glass works of Christopher Whall (1849–1924).

Whall's works include:
 Gloucester Cathedral
 War Memorial windows
 Works in Scotland
 Cathedral and minster windows

Works in parish churches

Gallery

Other works
As stated above, Whall was educated at Rossall School in Lancashire. He returned there in 1891 to execute a stained glass window for the school chapel working together with Louis Davis. The window by Whall and Davis was dedicated to the Reverend W.A.Osborne who was the Headmaster at Rossall for many years and would in fact have been the Headmaster when the young Whall was a pupil at the school.

In 1890 Whall executed a three-light traceried East  window for the South Chapel of Dorchester Cemetery.

John Dando Sedding designed St Saviour’s House in Bristol, the building being completed by Henry Wilson. In 1894 Whall executed a window for the quadrangle corridor,  this described by Andrew Foyle and Nikolaus Pevsner as "a fine window of the Good Shepherd in a thorny thicket" in their volume The Buildings of England. Somerset: North and Bristol. St Saviour’s House is currently used as a Nursing Home.

Whall designed one of the two windows in the regimental chapel of the old London Woolwich Barracks and when these barracks were closed the windows were moved to St Alban the Martyr Church in Larkhill, Wiltshire. Whall's window included scenes of the old buildings of the Barracks. St Alban the Martyr is a Garrison Church and stands next to the main entrance of the Royal School of Artillery. In Whall's own description of the window, held at the Victoria & Albert Museum, he states that the subject of the window is Peace.  The window is of five lights and the central light shows Christ in His Mother's arms, surrounded by His Heavenly Court of Cherubim and Seraphim, with Michael and Gabriel in support. Christ blesses the world from His Throne, to which is fixed the olive branch which is the Sceptre of His Kingdom and on which sits the dove with the olive leaf, the symbol of reconciliation. Beneath the Manger Cradle a child angel plays upon a dulcimer. A bodyguard of honour is grouped around the Throne, composed of those old warriors of the past who in their day have done their duty; while at its foot those who are carrying on the task kneel in worship.  Another light shows the ruin and desolation of war with a depiction of Ypres in flames. St George stands in the breach and a young trumpeter is ready to sound the note of battle. Below is the kneeling figure of General Borgard, the "Father of the Regiment" and one of Marlborough's officers of artillery. In another light Whall depicts the era of Waterloo and in another he turns to the Crimea. In the lower portion of these two lights are grouped types of the present-day regiments in worship. Whall depicts the Field Service (with Mons ribbon and service stripes), the Padre, the Parade uniform and the Indian Service. The fifth and final light commemorates the Alliances of the late war with depictions of a French and Belgian soldier. These are placed under the patronage of the glorious Crusader, St Louis (Louis IX of France.) In the background is the Sainte Chapelle and at the base of the window is a view of the Royal Military Academy itself and the motto Quo Fas Et Gloria Ducunt.

There were instances where Whall was commissioned to submit designs for windows but in the event the commissions came to nought.
In 1913 for example, Whall was asked to produce a scheme for five windows for the fifteenth century Lady Chapel of Christchurch Priory, but the windows were never made. There was opposition to Whall's windows on architectural/antiquarian grounds as his proposal involved the removal of the existing Victorian East window and structural changes to the half-windows on the North and South sides. Another such case involved six side windows for the Kensington Borough Cemetery Chapel at Hanwell. All six side windows were to represent Biblical incidents prophetic of the Resurrection. It is not known why the commission was not carried out.

Lost works

In the volume West Kent and The Weald,  Pevsner refers to some Whall stained glass in the Tonbridge School Chapel. The windows were lost in the 1988 fire which destroyed much of the chapel. Had these windows survived they would undoubtedly be ranged along with those at Holy Trinity Sloane Street and Gloucester Cathedral as Whall's best works.  St Augustine's Chapel at Tonbridge School was built between 1900 and 1909 and the headmaster at that time, Rev. Charles Tancock, D.D., had been headmaster at Rossall School when Whall worked on a window there. His daughter, Rachel Tancock, was to become one of Whall's students.  Whall's East window in St Augustine's was a complex allegory of Redemption through Incarnation. Whall also designed two windows for the Sanctuary, these on the theme of Judgement.  It was intended that the chapel would also have a series of windows representing the lives of English and Scottish patron saints and Whall designed what was known as the Welldon memorial window which depicted St Andrew, his life and his works. This window, in memory of Dr Welldon who was a former headmaster, includes the school motto "Deus dat incrementum", a motto chosen by Welldon. Another such window was what was to be known as the Graham memorial window, this depicting St Margaret of Scotland. In the central panel St Margaret holds in her right hand the Black Cross which she brought with her to Scotland, and which was the origin of "Holy Rood". This window commemorated Isabella Graham, the wife and mother of former Tonbridge pupils. The next such window, the South African War Memorial window, was of three-lights, and represented St George of Cappadocia and incidents from his life. This window includes the motto of the Skinners Company "In Christo Fratres". This series of windows featuring patron saints was continued in later years by Karl Parsons, Lilian Pocock and Rachel Tancock, all of whom had studied under Whall. Her best known work is the stained glass window in St Botolph's Church, Cambridge.
The same Pevsner volume refers to work by Whall in All Saints Church, Swanscombe, Kent.  This Norman Shaw designed church, dates from 1893, opened in 1895 but was closed in 1971 and converted to apartments. The Whall window may still be intact but within the apartment block.
Whall completed a Great War memorial window in 1918 for St Mark's Church in Leeds. It shows the stoning of Stephen, the first Christian martyr. The window commemorates Second Lieutenant Cecil Wellesley Ward, Royal Fleet Auxiliary, elder son of the Rev George Nussey Ward of Askham Bryan near York.  He was killed in action in 1917 during the First World War.  Although closed between 2001 - 2014, this church has now been restored by Gateway Church, Leeds as a place of worship and community use.

Notes

Please see Peter Cormack, Arts & Crafts Stained Glass (Yale University Press, 2015)

References

Christopher Whall